Castellucci is an Italian surname. Notable people with the surname include:

Cecil Castellucci (born 1969), American-born Canadian young adult novelist, indie rocker and director
Eugenio Castellucci, Argentine professional football player
Giovanni Castellucci (born 1959), Italian businessman
Lars Castellucci (born 1974), German politician
Romeo Castellucci (born 1960), Italian theater director, playwright, artist and designer
Salvi Castellucci (1608–1672), Italian painter 
Teddy Castellucci (born 1965), American film score composer

Italian-language surnames